Kari Haakana (born November 8, 1973 in Outokumpu, Finland) is a former ice hockey defenceman. He spent the majority of his career in Scandinavia, with brief stints in Germany and with the Edmonton Oilers.

Biography
As a youth, Haakana played in the 1987 Quebec International Pee-Wee Hockey Tournament with a team from Espoo.

The Oilers selected Haakana in the eight round (248th overall) of the 2001 NHL Entry Draft. Haakana entered the entry draft as an overaged player and came over to Canada the following year, briefly playing  for the Hamilton Bulldogs. He spent 13 games in the Oilers lineup, playing safe defensive hockey, but showing little in the way of offensive ability, scoring no points and only recording two shots.

He returned to Europe during the 2004–05 NHL lockout. Haakana played in Kiekko-Espoo for several years and also in Espoo Blues. Haakana played for Swedish Elitserien team, Skellefteå AIK from the beginning of the 2006 season to mid-January 2008 when he decided to cancel his contract and move back home to Finland to play for Kärpät.

Career statistics

Regular season and playoffs

International

References

External links

1973 births
Edmonton Oilers draft picks
Edmonton Oilers players
Espoo Blues players
Füchse Duisburg players
Finnish ice hockey defencemen
Hamilton Bulldogs (AHL) players
HDD Olimpija Ljubljana players
Jokerit players
Living people
Lukko players
Modo Hockey players
Skellefteå AIK players
Starbulls Rosenheim players
People from Outokumpu
Sportspeople from North Karelia
20th-century Finnish people
21st-century Finnish people